Hugo Gellert (born Hugó Grünbaum, May 3, 1892  December 9, 1985) was a Hungarian-American illustrator and muralist. A committed radical and member of the Communist Party of America, Gellert created much work for political activism in the 1920s and 1930s. It was distinctive in style, considered by some art critics as among the best political work of the first half of the 20th century.

His family immigrated to New York in 1906. Gellert studied in art schools in New York. His illustrations were first published in radical Hungarian and American magazines, but in the 1920s Gellert worked as a staff artist for The New Yorker magazine and The New York Times newspaper. Although he was opposed to United States' entry into World War I, when conditions were worsening in Europe in 1939 after the rise of Nazi Germany, Gellert helped organize "Artists for Defense"; he later became chairman of "Artists for Victory", which included over 10,000 members.

Biography

Early years

Hugo Gellert<ref>See: his "Gellért Hugó" signature in his 1916 cover art from Elöre"</ref> was born Hugó Grünbaum on May 3, 1892 in Budapest, Hungary, to a Jewish family. In 1906, the family immigrated to the United States, arriving in New York City. They settled there and changed their surname.

Gellert studied at the Cooper Union and the National Academy of Design. He married a woman named Livia.

Art and politics

Gellert, a committed socialist who later joined the Communist Party of America, considered his politics inseparable from his art. He had said that "Being an artist and being a communist are one and the same."  He used his art to advance his ideals for the common people. Much of his art depicted what he saw as the injustices of racial divides and capitalism.  Often his works were captioned with slogans to further the illustration.  The Working Day, for example shows a black laborer standing back to back with a white miner. It is accompanied by a phrase from Karl Marx's Das Kapital, "Labor with a white skin cannot emancipate itself where labor with a black skin is branded." 

 Art as politics 

Opposed to World War I, Gellert published his first anti-war art in 1916. His work was prominently featured both in the illustrated magazine of the Hungarian Socialist Federation of the Socialist Party of America, Előre (Forward), as well as Max Eastman's radical monthly magazine The Masses from this time. He also created numerous illustrations for Eastman's successor magazine, The Liberator, as well as sundry publications of the Communist Party USA after its formation, such as The Workers Monthly and The New Masses. Later, Gellert was offered a position as a staff artist for The New Yorker magazine. In 1925, he moved to the New York Times.

In 1927, Gellert was appointed the leader of the Anti-Horthy League, the first American anti-fascist organization. In this capacity, he organized a demonstration against U.S. president Calvin Coolidge, and both he and his wife were arrested while picketing the White House.

In 1932, the Museum of Modern Art in New York City, feeling uncomfortable about Gellert's public persona and politics, petitioned to have Gellert's work removed from its collection. However, they were forced to reconsider when other artists, many of whom did not share Gellert's social idealism, came to his defense as fellow artists and threatened to withdraw their own works.

In 1934 Gellert was among the leaders of the Artists Committee of Action, an informal group which had formed to protest Nelson Rockefeller's destruction of Diego Rivera's mural Man at the Crossroads early in the year at Rockefeller Center. Gellert was instrumental in the establishment of Art Front magazine, which started publication in November 1934 and was at first jointly published by the ACA and the Artists Union.

In 1939, Gellert helped organize the group, "Artists for Defense". He later became the Chairman for "Artists for Victory", an organization that included over 10,000 members.

Death and legacy

Gellert died in Freehold Township, New Jersey on December 9, 1985.

Gellert's social commentary, his work and his beliefs have placed him among the greatest American social artists of the Art Deco era, according to experts in the field.

His brother Ernest, also a socialist, was drafted in 1917 but refused induction, claiming to be a conscientious objector. He was convicted of refusing the draft and sentenced to prison.  Gellert fled to Mexico after Ernest died of a gunshot wound in prison at Fort Hancock, New Jersey, officially a suicide.  Their brother Lawrence was a music collector; in the 1930s he documented black protest traditions in the South of the United States.

Although remembered for his art in print, Gellert also painted a number of  public murals and frescoes. Among the surviving frescoes is the series that adorn the front entryways of each of the four buildings of the Seward Park Housing Corporation, a housing cooperative with 1728 apartments, designed and built by Herman Jessor as part of the social housing cooperatives built by the Abraham Kazan and the United Housing Foundation,.  In 2003, the series became the topic of controversy after the cooperative converted from its limited equity status to a fully private and market-rate residential co-op. The cooperative attempted to remove or destroy the four giant Gellert murals. The Co-op board felt the socialist-style paintings were no longer representative of the people or the Lower East Side neighborhood.

Public protests and letter writing, inspired threats of legal action and other possible setbacks, caused the plan to be delayed.  Gellert's artwork can still be seen in each of the buildings.

 Publications 
 The Mirrors of Wall Street. Text by Anonymous, drawings by Gellert. New York: G.P. Putnam's Sons, 1933.
 Karl Marx, Das Kapital in Lithographs. New York: R. Long and R.R. Smith, 1934.
 Comrade Gulliver: An Illustrated Account of Travel into that Strange Country the United States of America. New York: G.P. Putnam's Sons, 1935.
 "Aesop Said So". New York: Covici Friede, 1936.

 Wallace, Henry A., Century of the common man'' (1943)

References

External links

 Overview of Hugo Gellert's life and work, GraphicWitness.org
 Hugo Gellert's Seward Park Murals. History and index page showing photographs of the four Seward Park murals. Retrieved October 1, 2009
 The Hugo Gellert Papers Online at the Smithsonian Archives of American Art
 Comrades in Art:  Hugo Gellert
 Tamiment Library - Oral Histories - Hugo Gellert
 Hugo Gellert works at marxists.org

American communists
American illustrators
American satirists
American male non-fiction writers
American anti-fascists
American people of Hungarian-Jewish descent
Austro-Hungarian emigrants to the United States
People from Budapest
Jewish American artists
1892 births
1985 deaths
Cooper Union alumni
National Academy of Design alumni